Miami Christian School is a private Christian school in Fontainebleau, in unincorporated Miami-Dade County, Florida. The school has a Miami address.

Athletics
Miami Christian has a prominent tradition in athletics.
 
It has eight FHSAA State Championships in school history. The Boys' Basketball program holds 5 state championships in 2000, 2002, 2015, 2017 and 2018. The Baseball team has won three state championships in 1975, 2018 and 2019.

Notable alumni
J. J. Barea, Professional basketball player for the National Basketball Association (NBA).
Frank Jimenez, 21st General Counsel of the U.S. Department of the Navy.
David Rivera, politician and member of the United States House of Representatives.

References
	

Christian schools in Florida
Educational institutions established in 1954
Private K-12 schools in Miami-Dade County, Florida
1954 establishments in Florida